No Friends is the second studio album and debut independent studio album by American rapper Loon, released in August 2006 via Cleopatra Records.

Track listing
"Intro"
"Run"
"Eyes on U"
"You Crazy"
"Mobb Style"
"Skit 1"
"Live or Die"
"Straightjacket" featuring Gritty
"Skit 2"
"Came to Get Down" featuring Gritty
"Belly Dance" featuring Gritty
"Distracted"
"Skit 3"
"Nova / What Happened to Pastor? [Mase Diss Track]"
"Think Again"

References 

Loon (rapper) albums
2006 albums
Cleopatra Records albums